Ōmidaidokoro (大御台所) was a title that can only be given to the past shōguns official widow or retired shōguns chief consort/wife. These women had an extraordinary or considerable political power behind the scenes, leading much of the court's events and other events that impacted Japanese history. During the Edo period she resided in Ōoku, third corridor (sannomaru).

Kamakura period
 Hōjō Masako, daughter of Hojō Tokimasa, wife of Minamoto no Yoritomo and mother of Minamoto no Yoriie and Minamoto no Sanetomo
 Bomon Nobuko (1193–1274), daughter of Bomon Nobukiyo and wife of Minamoto no Sanetomo
 Konoe Saiko (b. 1241), daughter of Konoe Kanetsune, wife of Prince Munetaka and mother of Prince Koreyasu

Muromachi period
 Akahashi Toshi (1306–1365) wife of Ashikaga Takauji and mother of Ashikaga Yoshiakira
 Shibukawa Koshi (1332–1392), daughter of Shibukawa Yoshisue and wife of Ashikaga Yoshiakira
 Hino Nariko (1351–1405),wife of Ashikaga Yoshimitsu and daughter of Hino Tokimitsu
 Hino Eiko (1390–1431), wife of Ashikaga Yoshimochi, daughter of Hino Motoyasu and mother of Ashikaga Yoshikazu
 Hino Muneko (d. 1447), wife of Ashikaga Yoshinori and daughter of Hino Shigemitsu
 Hino Tomiko, wife of Ashikaga Yoshimasa, daughter of Hino Shigemasa and mother of Ashikaga Yoshihisa
 Hino Akiko, daughter of Hino Nagatoshi, wife of Ashikaga Yoshizumi and mother of Ashikaga Yoshiharu
 Keijuin (1514–1565), daughter of Konoe Hisamichi, wife of Ashikaga Yoshiharu and mother of Ashikaga Yoshiteru

Edo period
 Oeyo, daughter of Azai Nagamasa, wife of Tokugawa Hidetada and mother of Tokugawa Iemitsu
 Takatsukasa Takako (1622–1683) later Honriin, wife of Tokugawa Iemitsu and daughter of Takatsukasa Nobufusa
 Takatsukasa Nobuko (1651–1709) later Tenjoin, wife of Tokugawa Tsunayoshi and daughter of Takatsukasa Norihira
 Konoe Hiroko (1666–1741) later Ten-ei'in, wife of Tokugawa Ienobu and daughter of Konoe Motohiro
 Imperial Princess Yasonomiya Yoshiko later Jorin'in-no-Miya (1714–1758), wife of Tokugawa Ietsugu and daughter of Emperor Reigen
 Shimazu no Shigehime or Tadakohime (1773–1844) later Kodai-in, wife of Tokugawa Ienari and daughter of Shimazu Shigehide of Satsuma Domain
 Shimazu Atsuhime or Fujiwara no Sumiko, later Tenshō-in, wife of Tokugawa Iesada, daughter of Shimazu Nariakira and adopted daughter of Konoe Tadahiro
 Chikako, Princess Kazu, later Seikan'in-no-miya, wife of Tokugawa Iemochi and daughter of Emperor Ninkō

See also 
 Midaidokoro

Japanese culture